HIJOS is an acronym for Hijos por la Identidad y la Justicia contra el Olvido y el Silencio (English: Sons and Daughters for Identity and Justice Against forgetfulness and Silence). It is the name of two organizations founded by children of people who were forcibly "disappeared" by military dictatorships in Argentina and Guatemala. The Argentine organization was founded in 1995 in Córdoba and La Plata. The Guatemalan organization, founded in 1999 and based in Guatemala City, has received many death threats from government sympathizers.

HIJOS Guatemala raises awareness by painting graffiti style murals dealing with the death of their relatives and how Guatemalan youth and Mayan youth are treated in the country.

In Argentina, HIJOS in 1995 started to perform escraches to raise public awareness about former dirty-war criminals being free on the streets despite their crimes.

Notes

External links
Official Buenos Aires website

Human rights organisations based in Argentina
Human rights organizations based in Guatemala
Children of people disappeared during Dirty War
Political movements in Argentina
Dirty War
Women's organisations based in Argentina
Enforced disappearance
Argentine human rights activists
Adoption, fostering, orphan care and displacement
Kidnapping in Argentina
Child abduction
Missing Argentine children
Child-related organisations in Argentina
Kidnapped children
Kidnapping in the 1970s
Kidnapping in the 1980s